This is a list of museums in Dominica.

Museums in Dominica 

The Dominica Museum
Roseau Cathedral crypt 
 Old Mill Cultural Centre & Museum
 Touna Kalinago Heritage Village 
 Macoucherie Rum Distillery.

See also 
 List of museums

References 	

 
Museums
Dominica
Museums
Dominica